Supplemental Arrows-A is a Unicode block containing various arrow symbols.

Block

History
The following Unicode-related documents record the purpose and process of defining specific characters in the Supplemental Arrows-A block:

See also 
 Mathematical operators and symbols in Unicode

References 

Unicode blocks